Cartwright is a community located on the eastern side of the entrance to Sandwich Bay, along the southern coast of Labrador in the province of Newfoundland and Labrador, Canada. It was incorporated in 1956. Cartwright is the largest settlement in NunatuKavut.

Cartwright has been a settled community since 1775. In 1775, Captain George Cartwright, for whom the place is named, settled there, establishing a fish and fur trading business. He left Labrador in 1786, maintaining a business interest there until it was sold to Hunt and Henley in 1815. It was again sold in 1873 to the Hudson's Bay Company and has remained under company ownership ever since.

Since 2002, Cartwright has been connected by road (a section of the Trans-Labrador Highway, Route 516) with Blanc Sablon, Quebec, where there is a car ferry to Newfoundland. Since December 2009 the remaining link between Cartwright and Happy Valley-Goose Bay, Labrador has been completed and open to the public.

Demographics

Climate
Cartwright has a subarctic climate (Dfc) with very snowy winters and short, mild summers. Snow is usually fully melted early in June and is established again in early November.

See also
 Blackguard Bay
 List of cities and towns in Newfoundland and Labrador
 NunatuKavut

References

External links

Populated coastal places in Canada
Towns in Newfoundland and Labrador
Populated places in Labrador
Hudson's Bay Company trading posts